Roberto Jesús Saldías Díaz (born 25 February 1993) is a Chilean footballer who last played for Deportes Linares in the Segunda División Profesional de Chile.

Personal life
He is son of the Chilean popular humorist known as El Chino (The Chinese) from Los Atletas de la Risa (The Laugh Athletes).

References

External links
 

1993 births
Living people
Footballers from Santiago
Chilean footballers
Santiago Wanderers footballers
Rangers de Talca footballers
Deportes Linares footballers
Chilean Primera División players
Primera B de Chile players
Segunda División Profesional de Chile players
Association football forwards